Veronika Schneider (born July 17, 1987, in Budapest, Hungary) is a Hungarian chess woman grandmaster. In 2011, she shared first position with Anna Rudolf and Ticia Gara in the Hungarian Women Chess Championship.

References

Chessgames.com, FIDE and ChessBase

External links
Veronika Schneider chess games online
Veronika Schneider Blog

1987 births
Living people
Sportspeople from Budapest
Hungarian chess players
Chess woman grandmasters